Tamás Filó (born 6 December 1979 in Budapest) is a Hungarian football player who currently plays for Budapest Honvéd FC.

External links 
Budapest Honved FC Official Website

1979 births
Living people
Hungarian footballers
Budapest Honvéd FC players
Fehérvár FC players
Association football defenders
Footballers from Budapest